Sergey Yasinsky (born 7 January 1965) is a Belarusian professional football coach and former player. Since 2020, he is a head coach of Belarus national under-21 football team.

References

External links
 Profile at teams.by
 

1965 births
Living people
Sportspeople from Vitebsk
Belarusian footballers
Association football midfielders
Belarusian expatriate footballers
Expatriate footballers in Poland
Expatriate footballers in Hungary
Expatriate footballers in Israel
Belarusian Premier League players
FC Vitebsk players
FC Lokomotiv Vitebsk (defunct) players
Jagiellonia Białystok players
FC Torpedo Mogilev players
Shimshon Tel Aviv F.C. players
Stadler FC footballers
Belarusian football managers
FC Vitebsk managers
FC SKVICH Minsk managers
FC Slavia Mozyr managers